Minori Kishi (born 14 October 1994) is a Japanese professional footballer who plays as a defender for WE League club Chifure AS Elfen Saitama.

Club career 
Kishi made her WE League debut on 12 September 2021.

References 

Living people
1994 births
Japanese women's footballers
Women's association football defenders
People from Higashikurume, Tokyo
Association football people from Tokyo Metropolis
Chifure AS Elfen Saitama players
WE League players